Essays are short pieces of writing from an author's personal point of view.

Essays may also refer to:

 Essays (Montaigne), a book by Michel de Montaigne
 Essays (Francis Bacon), a book by Francis Bacon
 Essays (Emerson), several collections of essays by Ralph Waldo Emmerson, including:
 Essays: First Series, 1841
 Essays: Second Series, 1844

See also
 Essay (disambiguation)